The 1956–57 French Rugby Union Championship was contested by 48 clubs divided in six pools of eight. The five better of each pool and the two better sixth (for a sum of 32 clubs) were qualified to play the final phase .

The Championship was won by Lourdes that defeated Racing in the final. Lourdes maintained the title won in 1956.

Context 
The 1957 Five Nations Championship was won by Ireland, France ended last with won a match.

The Challenge Yves du Manoir was won by Dax that beat the Montferrand (the final match was tied 6-6 but Dax won for the lower medium age of the players)

Qualification round 

In bold the clubs qualified for the next round

"Last 32" 

In bold the clubs qualified for the next round

"Last 16" 

In bold the clubs qualified for the next round

Quarter of finals 

In bold the clubs qualified for the next round

Semifinals 

Racing was declared winner, thanks to the younger medium age of the player.

Final

External links
 Compte rendu finale de 1957 lnr.fr

1957
France 1957
Championship